James Sullins Varnell Jr. (December 9, 1921 – April 9, 1945) was a United States Army Air Forces fighter ace who was credited with shooting down 17 aircraft during World War II; he was the top ace of the 52nd Fighter Group.

See also
RAF Goxhill
Richard L. Alexander

References

External links

1921 births
1945 deaths
American World War II flying aces
Recipients of the Silver Star
Recipients of the Distinguished Flying Cross (United States)
United States Army Air Forces pilots of World War II
United States Army Air Forces personnel killed in World War II
Aviators killed in aviation accidents or incidents in the United States